The enzyme fusarinine-C ornithinesterase (EC 3.1.1.48) catalyzes the reaction

N 5-acyl-L-ornithine ester + H2O  N 5-acyl-L-ornithine + an alcohol

This enzyme belongs to the family of hydrolases, specifically those acting on carboxylic ester bonds.  The systematic name of this enzyme class is N 5-L-ornithine-ester hydrolase. Other names in common use include ornithine esterase, and 5-N 5-L-ornithine-ester hydrolase.

References 

 

EC 3.1.1
Enzymes of unknown structure